League of Legends is an esports game widely played at both amateur and professional levels. This is a list of League of Legends competitions organized or sponsored by the game's publisher, Riot Games.

International tournaments

Tier 1 leagues 
As of 2023, there are 9 professional leagues for League of Legends around the world. 

For the Mid-Season Invitational with 13 spots:

 The LEC, LPL, LCS and LCK are allocated 2 spots each.
 The remaining five regions are allocated 1 spot each.

For the World Championship with 22 spots:

 The LPL and LCK are allocated 4 spots each.
 The LEC and LCS are allocated 3 spots each and have a shared spot that is decided via Worlds Qualifying Series - a BO5 match between 4th seed teams from both regions.
 The PCS and VCS are allocated 2 spots each.
 The remaining three regions are allocated 1 spot each.

League cups

Tier 2 and lower leagues

Former tier 1 and 2 leagues

Upgraded or downgraded leagues

Replaced

Cancelled

Other tournaments 

"Established" and "ended" refers to the years the tournament hosted a League of Legends tournament, not necessarily the years the competition itself was held.

Collegiate leagues

Campus Series conferences

Notes

References 

 
League